Heceta Head Light is a lighthouse on the Oregon Coast  north of Florence, and  south of Yachats in the United States. It is located at Heceta Head Lighthouse State Scenic Viewpoint, a state park, midway up a 205-foot-tall (62 m) headland.

The light is maintained by the Oregon Parks and Recreation Department (OPRD), while the assistant lighthouse keepers' house, operated as a bed-and-breakfast inn, is maintained by the U.S. Forest Service.

History and construction

Heceta Head is named after the Spanish explorer Bruno de Heceta, who explored the Pacific Northwest during the late 18th century. Before him, Heceta Head was a spot of frequent fishing and hunting by the American Indian tribes that populated the area. Heceta Head is part of the Siuslaw Indians' traditional lands, known in their language as ɫtúwɪs.  They hunted sea lions in the area and gathered sea bird eggs from the offshore rocks. It was also the site of a legend — the Animal People built a great stone wall, which is now the cliffs, and tricked the Grizzly Bear brothers to their deaths there. In 1888, white settlers moved into the area and claimed  of the surrounding land. That same year, the United States Lighthouse Service approved the building of the lighthouse, and the government bought , out of the  previously purchased, for the lighthouse structures.

In 1892, a crew of 56 began construction on the site. Because of the site's seclusion, building materials were either shipped in, if the weather and tide permitted, or brought from Florence by wagon, the latter usually taking four to five hours. Stones were brought from the Clackamas River and bricks came from San Francisco. The lens system was made by Chance Brothers. Completed in August 1893, the entire project cost $80,000 and consisted of:
The lighthouse
Houses for the head lightkeeper, the two assistant lightkeepers and their families
A barn
Two kerosene oil storage buildings — if one had caught fire, there was a secondary source

Heceta Head Light and Keepers Quarters was placed on the National Register of Historic Places in 1978 for its architectural and engineering significance.  The site originally included several other buildings — farm buildings and the single-family head lighthouse keeper's house, which was demolished in 1940, and was very similar in size and design to the remaining house. After electricity was installed in the lighthouse buildings, the position of head lighthouse keeper was no longer needed. The lighthouse keeper's house was sold for $10, and dismantled for its lumber, which was used to build Alpha Bit bookstore-cafe in Mapleton, still in existence today. The remaining keepers' house was a duplex that housed the first and second assistant lighthouse keepers and their families. After the light was automated in 1963, the last keepers moved away, and the remaining house was leased to Lane Community College in 1970 by the U.S. Forest Service, which had taken over management of the building. The porch of the Queen Anne-style house underwent restoration in 1981.

The Heceta Head Lighthouse closed to the public in August 2011 for restoration and repairs. Under the supervision of OPRD preservation architect Sue Licht, a team of more than 100 subcontractors and craftsmen, the majority of whom were from Oregon, removed cement stucco that had sealed in moisture so that the lighthouse could air out in the damp coastal environment. They also replaced and restored the tower's historic metalwork and masonry, installed new windows, and repaired the lens' rotating mechanism. The interior and exterior of the lighthouse were repainted and the original wood floor of the workroom was uncovered and reconditioned. The lighthouse has been returned as much as possible to the way it would have looked in 1894. When restoration work was completed, it was reopened after being closed for two years, on June 8, 2013. That day the OPRD welcomed a group of nearly 100 supporters to Heceta Head State Scenic Viewpoint to celebrate the reopening.

See also
List of lighthouses in Oregon
List of Oregon state parks

References

External links

Heceta Head Lighthouse Keeper’s House (official website)
Heceta Head Light entry in National Park Service inventory of historic lighthouses
Discover Oregon Lighthouses: Heceta
"Ghostly Tale Draws Couple To Heceta Head", May 16, 2002 article from The Register-Guard
Heceta House: A History and Architectural Survey from the U.S. Forest Service
 3D Model

Lighthouses completed in 1893
Lighthouses on the National Register of Historic Places in Oregon
Oregon Coast
National Register of Historic Places in Lane County, Oregon
Transportation buildings and structures in Lane County, Oregon
Parks in Lane County, Oregon
Bed and breakfasts in Oregon